The Drama Desk Award for Outstanding Sound Design in a Play is an annual award presented by Drama Desk in recognition of achievements in the theatre among Broadway, Off Broadway and Off-Off Broadway productions. The category was created in the 2010 ceremony when the Drama Desk Award for Outstanding Sound Design was split in two — Sound Design in a Play, and Sound Design in a Musical.

Winners and nominees

2010s

2020s

See also
 Laurence Olivier Award for Best Sound Design
 Tony Award for Best Sound Design

References

External links
 Drama Desk official website

Sound Design